Terry Pratchett's Hogfather is a 2006 two-part British Christmas-themed fantasy comedy television miniseries adaptation of Hogfather by Terry Pratchett, produced by The Mob, and first broadcast on Sky1, and in High Definition on Sky1 HD, over Christmas 2006. First aired in two 1.5-hour episodes on 17 and 18 December 2006 at 20:00 UTC, it was the first live-action film adaptation of a Discworld novel. In 2007, the two episodes were rerun on Christmas Eve and Christmas Day respectively on Sky One and Sky1 HD.

Hogfather won the Interactivity Award at the 2007 BAFTA TV Awards for its use of the interactive options available on digital television.

Plot
The series closely follows the plot of the novel, in which the Hogfather, the Discworld equivalent of Father Christmas, has gone missing and Death is forced to take his place while Death's granddaughter Susan attempts to find out what happened.

Main cast

Pratchett himself has a cameo as a toymaker, in addition to his official script credit of 'Mucked About By'. Although not named in the original book or the script, Pratchett decided the toymaker was named Joshua Isme, and his shop was Toys Is Me (a play on Toys R Us). The set dressing for the toyshop included appropriate labels.

The Death of Rats was credited as played by "Dorckey Hellmice", an anagram of "Michelle Dockery".

Both Nigel Planer, who plays Sideney and the voice of the Auditors, and Tony Robinson, who plays Mr Crumley, have been the readers for many of the audiobook editions of the Discworld novels, and have both had voice acting roles in the Discworld video games.

Ian Richardson also played Francis Urquhart in the BBC series House of Cards; Death's line to Albert, mirrors a similar phrase of Urquhart's. This would be his last role on television shown before his death.

David Jason would later go on to play Rincewind in the adaptation of The Colour of Magic.

Production

Development
The storyboarding for the film was by artist Stephen Briggs, who drew The Streets of Ankh-Morpork and The Discworld Mapp. Bernard Pearson was involved with the 'look' of Ankh-Morpork. Some interior and exterior scenes were shot in Spring 2005 at Sutton House, Hackney, with extensive use of artificial snow to create winter.

Writing
Though the film was quite faithful to the novel, even in script, there were a few changes. The Death of Rats is reduced to a one-scene cameo in the film where it reaps the soul of a mouse caught in a trap on Hogswatchnight, and then watches Death deliver presents, whereas in the novel it appears much more often with Quoth the Raven. The invasion of the tooth castle is covered in more detail in the movie, as is the gathering and controlling of the teeth. The annihilation of two of Teatime's associates were removed; thus, instead of Sideney being caught in the playground of his old elementary school (with curls), he was killed by the Scissor Man, and Catseye's fear of the dark is given to Mr. Brown. The Cheerful Fairy and the Towel Wasp are both removed, along with any mention of the Money Bag Goblin by the Dean. Mention of Bibulous, the opposite brother of Bilious, is removed, and so is the Hangover Imp that is pounding Bilious' head in the scene where Susan meets him. Medium Dave and Banjo's surname in the novel is 'Lilywhite', not 'Cropper', although Teatime refers to Medium Dave as 'Mr. Lilywhite' while threatening him in the tower, and Mr. Brown refers to their mother as 'Ma Lilywhite'. 'Chickenwire' is the character's surname in the film as opposed to a nickname in the book.

The line  was added to Death's dialogue with Albert in the movie. It is iconically associated with Francis Urquhart, the protagonist of House of Cards played by Death's voice actor, Ian Richardson.

Special effects 
The CGI for the show was done by Moving Picture Company.

Promotion
The film premiered at the Curzon Cinema in Mayfair on Monday 27 November 2006. Part 1 and a teaser for part 2 were shown.

Beginning the second week of December, Sky began using a new Christmas ident for Sky One, Two and Three, featuring the Hogfather's sleigh and the message "Happy Hogswatch". The song "Santa Claus Is Coming to Town" was used on Hogfather radio advertisements with the word "Hogfather" replacing "Santa Claus".  A "making of" documentary entitled The Whole Hog was shown on Sky One on the 10th. The film was shown on the 17 and 18 December on Sky One, and was repeated shortly afterwards on Christmas Day and Boxing Day.

International broadcast
The film has been aired in numerous countries. In December 2007, Australia's Seven Network aired the film across two nights, on 23 and 24 December. It was also released on DVD in a two-tiered scheme in the US, being sold exclusively at Borders Book stores from 18 November 2007 to 3 March 2008, when it was released wide. None of the extras from the British limited edition DVD are included, the only extras being an interview with Terry Pratchett and the original trailer.

Home media 
Terry Pratchett's Hogfather was released on DVD in the UK (R2) on 23 April 2007 in both standard and limited-edition packaging. The DVD is dedicated to the memory of Ian Richardson, who died shortly after the programme was broadcast. The making of the Hogfather is also available on iTunes as a free video podcast.

The limited-edition release is a two-disc set, with an individually numbered case and signed card from Terry Pratchett. The second disc contains special features, including:

Deleted Scenes
Bilious (the oh god of Hangovers) introducing and explaining himself to Susan
Death and Albert discovering the altered Hogswatch card
Further explanation on the role of the ancient Hogfather
12 Days of Hogswatch (Death's Guide to Discworld)
A series of four 1–2-minute featurettes in which Death interviews Terry Pratchett, Stephen Briggs and others to explain various aspects of Discworld. The subjects are:

The Discworld
Death
Susan
The city of Ankh-Morpork

Unseen University
Albert
Nobbs and Visit
Mr Teatime

Mr Sideney
Hex
The Auditors
The Hogfather

The Whole Hog: Making Terry Pratchett's Hogfather documentary

See also
 List of Christmas films

References

External links

 
 

2006 British television series debuts
2006 British television series endings
2000s British comedy television series
2000s British television miniseries
Films set on fictional planets
Christmas television films
Discworld films and television series
British fantasy television series
Sky UK original programming
English-language television shows
Films directed by Vadim Jean